Lomnica is a village in Despotovac municipality, in the Pomoravlje District of Serbia.

Geography
Lomnica is located 10 kilometers from the town of Despotovac and about 7 kilometers from Manasija Monastery. It is situated at (roughly) about 600 meters above sea level. It is the third largest village in the municipality (after villages Plažane and Veliki Popović).

Population
In 1953, the population of Lomnica was 770.  In 2011, the population was recorded as 1284, with 324 total households.

Features
Near Lomnica is a small lake called Lomničko jezero, which is about 2 hectares in size for most of the year. The village has a part-time ambulance service with a doctor and nurse.

It also has a modern football pitch with around 1,000 seats, along with other smaller football pitches and basketball courts.

References

Populated places in Pomoravlje District